Finn Aabye (born 7 July 1935, Hellerup) is a Danish film producer. He was the former director of the Danish Film Institute.

Selected filmography 
 To (1964)

References

External links 
 
 

1935 births
Living people
Danish film directors
People from Gentofte Municipality